The 4th Golden Melody Awards ceremony was held at the Sun Yat-sen Memorial Hall in Taipei on November 21, 1992.

References

External links
  4th Golden Melody Awards nominees 
  4th Golden Melody Awards winners 

Golden Melody Awards
Golden Melody Awards
Golden Melody Awards
Golden Melody Awards